This is a list of monuments that are classified or inventoried by the Moroccan ministry of culture around Errachidia.

Monuments and sites in Errachidia 

|}

References 

Errachidia
Errachidia Province